Lonetree (also Lone Tree or Steele) is a ghost town in Chouteau County, Montana, United States. Founded circa 1885, it is located at  (47.5416396, -110.2840931), at an altitude of 3,123 feet (952 m). For nearly thirty years Lonetree possessed a post office, which was opened under the name of Steele on March 9, 1888; its name was changed to Lonetree on May 15, 1914. It bore this name for less than a year before closing on March 31, 1915.

The entire community of Lonetree was added to the National Register of Historic Places on September 11, 1980.

References

Geography of Chouteau County, Montana
Ghost towns in Montana
National Register of Historic Places in Chouteau County, Montana